Gone for Good is a 2021 French-language streaming television series created by David Elkaïm and Vincent Poymiro based on Harlan Coben's 2002 novel, Gone for Good. The series stars Finnegan Oldfield, Nicolas Duvauchelle and Guillaume Gouix.

Cast 
 Finnegan Oldfield as Guillaume Lucchesi
 Nicolas Duvauchelle as Fred Lucchesi
 Guillaume Gouix as Da Costa
 Garance Marillier as Inès Kasmi / Sonia
 Nailia Harzoune as Judith Conti/Nora
 Tómas Lemarquis as Ostertag
 Grégoire Colin as Kesler
 Jacques Bonnaffé as M. Lucchesi
 Ambre Hasaj as Inès Kasmi child
 Bojesse Christopher as Jo Ostertag
 Julie Moulier as Maéva Lucchesi
 Sonia Bonny Eboumbou as Awa
 Mila Ayache as Alice
 Maxime Gemin as Fred Lucchesi teenager
 Martin Laurent as Guillaume child
 Sean Guégan as Stan
 Olivier Fazio as BAC cop

Release
Gone for Good was released on 13 August 2021 on Netflix.

References

External links
 
 

Television shows based on American novels
French-language Netflix original programming
French crime drama television series
2020s crime drama television series
2020s French drama television series
French mystery television series
2021 French television series debuts
2021 French television series endings